This list ranks the top 50 most competitive cities in India as of the latest release in 2012. Delhi tops the list followed by Mumbai, Chennai, Hyderabad and Kolkata.

List

Lists of cities in India